William de Camargo (born 27 February 1999), sometimes known as just  William, is a Brazilian footballer who plays as a winger for Belgian club K.M.S.K. Deinze, on loan from Spanish club CD Leganés.

Club career
Born in Ribeirão Preto, São Paulo, William de Camargo joined São Paulo FC's youth setup in 2013, after impressing for clubs in his hometown. In April 2017, he moved to La Liga side CD Leganés, after his contract with Tricolor expired.

Initially assigned to the youth setup, William de Camargo made his senior debut with the reserves on 25 February 2018, coming on as a late substitute in a 5–0 Tercera División away routing of CDF Tres Cantos. His first goal came on 29 April, as he scored his team's first in a 2–2 home draw against CD Móstoles URJC.

On 30 August 2018, after spending the whole pre-season with the first team, William signed a one year loan deal with Ukrainian Premier League side FC Karpaty Lviv. He made his professional debut on 15 September, replacing Maryan Shved at half-time in a 0–1 home loss against FC Vorskla Poltava.

On 2 September 2019, William de Camargo was loaned to Segunda División B side FC Cartagena for the season. The following 22 August, after helping in the club's promotion to the second division, his loan was extended for a further campaign.

On 14 January 2021, William de Camargo left Efesé after his loan was cut short, and subsequently moved to Valencia CF Mestalla also in a temporary deal just hours later. On 5 July, he renewed his contract with Lega until 2023, and moved to Deportivo de La Coruña on loan.

On 1 September 2022, William was loaned to Belgian First Division B side K.M.S.K. Deinze, for one year.

References

External links

1999 births
Living people
People from Ribeirão Preto
Brazilian footballers
Association football wingers
Segunda División players
Primera Federación players
Segunda División B players
Tercera División players
CD Leganés B players
FC Cartagena footballers
Valencia CF Mestalla footballers
Deportivo de La Coruña players
Ukrainian Premier League players
FC Karpaty Lviv players
K.M.S.K. Deinze players
Brazilian expatriate footballers
Brazilian expatriate sportspeople in Spain
Brazilian expatriate sportspeople in Ukraine
Brazilian expatriate sportspeople in Belgium
Expatriate footballers in Spain
Expatriate footballers in Ukraine
Expatriate footballers in Belgium
Footballers from São Paulo (state)